Munavvar Samad qizi Kalantarli (1912, Lankaran – 1962, Baku) was an Azerbaijani actress and folk singer.

Career
Born to a wealthy landowner family descended from Iranian émigrés, Munavvar "Mina" Kalantarli received her primary education at Maryam Bayramalibeyova's Uns School for Girls in Lankaran. Her aunt-in-law and prominent Azerbaijani folk singer, Yavar Kalantarli, noticed young Mina's talent for singing and encouraged her to pursue career in music. In the early 1930s, Munavvar Kalantarli moved to Baku to work at the Azerbaijan State Opera Theatre, where together with Yavar Kalantarli and Munavvar's brother Hashim, she performed folk songs. Prior to becoming an actress Munavvar Kalantarli had not received professional training in acting. Nevertheless, her artistic personality, natural talent and good sense of humour soon got the attention of theatre directors, and in the mid-1930s she was offered a job as an actress at the Azerbaijan Musical Comedy Theatre. In 1937, she got married and give birth to a daughter. Having had to choose between her career and her personal life, Kalantarli divorced her husband when their daughter was still a toddler. Her career in comedy was a successful one. In 1945, she starred in her first movie - Arshin Mal Alan (dir. Ismayil Afandiyev) as Auntie Jahan. Overall she acted in 9 movies between 1945 and 1962. She quit theatre after being appointed assistant producer at the Vatan cinema in Baku.

Munavvar Kalantarli died in Baku after an unsuccessful surgery on her caecum.

See also 

 Yaver Kelenterli
 Jahan Talyshinskaya
 Hagigat Rzayeva

References

1912 births
1962 deaths
People from Lankaran
People from Baku Governorate
Azerbaijani people of Iranian descent
20th-century Azerbaijani actresses
Azerbaijani film actresses
Azerbaijani folk singers
Soviet Azerbaijani people
20th-century Azerbaijani women singers
People's Artists of Azerbaijan
Soviet actresses